Subahdar, also known as Nazim or in English as a "Subah", was one of the designations of a governor of a Subah (province) during the Khalji dynasty of Bengal, Mamluk dynasty (Delhi), Khalji dynasty, Tughlaq dynasty, Mughal era ( of India who was alternately designated as Sahib-i-Subah or Nazim. The word, Subahdar is of Persian origin. The Subahdar was the head of the Mughal provincial administration. He was assisted by the provincial Diwan, Bakshi, Faujdar, Kotwal, Qazi, Sadr, Waqa-i-Navis, Qanungo and Patwari. The Subahdars were normally appointed from the Mughal princes or the officers holding the highest mansabs (ranks).

Nazim

A nazim (from the Arabic word for "organizer" or "convenor"), similar to a mayor, was the coordinator of cities and towns in Pakistan. Nazim is the title in Urdu of the chief elected official of a local government in Pakistan, such as a district, tehsil, union council, or village council. Likewise, a deputy mayor is known as a Naib nazim. The word naib in Urdu literally means "assistant" or "deputy" hence Naib nazim was similar in function to a deputy mayor. He was also custodian of the house.

Pakistan originally had a system inherited from the time of British rule, in which a mayor was the head of a district. Under the Local Government Act, however, the role of the nazim became distinct from that of a mayor, with more power. The nazim system was introduced after the commissionerate system, imposed during British rule, was lifted by the government of Pakistan. This Local Government act was imposed in the country in 2001.  One exception, however, is Islamabad, the federal capital, where the commissionerate system remained in effect.
In 2009, the new government restored the commissionerate system. All the provinces introduced their own new local government systems.
A Nazim was also empowered to decide criminal cases. The Nazim was the lowliest of elected officials in Pakistan. The district nazim, is elected by the nazims of Union Councils, Union Councillors, and Tehsil Nazims, who themselves are elected directly by the votes of the local public.

The name which is used for the president of Islami Jamiat-e-Talaba, the Islamic Union of Students in Pakistan, is Nazim-e-ala. The nazim-e-ala is elected for one year, and after completing that tenure, all the members of IJT who are called (Arkaan) elect a new one.

References

Government of the Mughal Empire
Medieval India
History of Pakistan
History of India
Local government in Pakistan
Titles in India